Călărași is a commune in Botoșani County, Western Moldavia, Romania. It is composed of three villages: Călărași, Libertatea and Pleșani.

References

Communes in Botoșani County
Localities in Western Moldavia